In industrial engineering, a processing medium is a gaseous, vaporous, fluid or shapeless solid material that plays an active role in manufacturing processes - comparable to that of a tool.

Examples
A processing medium for washing is a soap solution, a processing medium for steel melting is a plasma, and a processing medium for steam drying is superheated steam.

Synonyms
Operating medium
Working medium.

Engineering concepts